An Italienzug (also known as Romfahrt or Romzug, Latin expeditio italica) was the expedition undertaken by an elected king of the Romans to be crowned Holy Roman emperor in City of Rome.

Prior to the reforms of Frederick Barbarossa, the kings of the Romans struggled to muster an army for the expedition, for they needed the formal approval of the Reichstag. If such permission was granted, the king had permission to recruit knights for their military service in Italy for 410 days. However, the nobility was generally disinterested and inclined to rather substitute a monetary payment for the service. Therefore, the small force tended to be composed out of mercenaries and high ranking clergymen, reinforced by loyal Italian cities. Occasionally the substitution wasn't enough and kings like Henry V ended up using their dowry to fund their Italienzug.

Following Barbarossa's struggles against the Lombard League towards the end of the 12th century, the system was reformed by banning monetary substitution and requiring each prince to contribute a fixed amount of troops for the cause. These troops could be substituted by an amount of money, which was eventually known as the Roman Month.

Examples 
 The 1154–55 Italienzug of Frederick I Barbarossa of Hohenstaufen
 The 1310–12 Italienzug of Henry VII of Luxemburg
 The 1508 failed Italienzug of Maximilian I of Habsburg during the opening phase of the War of the League of Cambrai
 The 1529 Italienzug preceding the Coronation of Charles V of Habsburg would be the last in history.

See also
 Coronation of the Holy Roman Emperor

References

History of the Holy Roman Empire
Medieval Italy